Lorain County Regional Airport  is a public airport in Lorain County, Ohio, owned by the Lorain County Board of Commissioners and located in New Russia Township. The airport is about 7 miles south of Lorain and 5 miles southwest of Elyria. The National Plan of Integrated Airport Systems for 2011–2015 categorized it as a general aviation reliever airport.

Facilities and aircraft 
Lorain County Regional Airport covers 1,149 acres (465 ha) at an elevation of 793 feet (242 m) above mean sea level. It has one asphalt runway, 7/25, 5,002 by 100 feet (1,525 x 30 m).

In the year ending August 11, 2010 the airport had 42,610 aircraft operations, average 116 per day: 82% general aviation, 18% air taxi, and <1% military. 88 aircraft were then based at the airport: 82% single-engine, 10% multi-engine, 6% helicopter, and 2% jet.

Incidents 
 On January 18, 2010, a Mitsubishi MU-2B-60 turboprop crashed on approach, killing four.

References

External links 
 Airport page at Lorain County website
 MRK Aviation, the fixed-base operator (FBO)
 Aerial photo as of March 1994 from USGS The National Map
 

Airports in Ohio
Transportation in Lorain County, Ohio
Buildings and structures in Lorain County, Ohio